The Eastern Kentucky Colonels football program represents Eastern Kentucky University (EKU) in college football, through the 2020-21 season as a member of the Ohio Valley Conference (OVC), and competes at the NCAA Division I Football Championship Subdivision (FCS) level. The school has traditionally had much success on the football field, having won 21 OVC conference titles and two Division I FCS National Championships (then called Division I-AA) in 1979 and 1982, and reaching the finals in 1980 and 1981. Much of the success came during the long tenure of head coach Roy Kidd from 1964 to 2002. In 1990, Eastern honored Kidd by naming the school's football stadium Roy Kidd Stadium. Eastern Kentucky's football team was able to secure 31 consecutive winning seasons before finally posting a losing season record in 2009.

In September 2013, the Lexington Herald-Leader, the daily newspaper of nearby Lexington, reported that EKU was considering moving its program to the top-level Football Bowl Subdivision. However, under NCAA rules, such a move would require that EKU receive an invitation from an existing FBS conference. In the end, no such move was made.

EKU left the OVC for the ASUN Conference in July 2021. While the ASUN does not currently sponsor football, it has committed to launching an FCS football league in the near future. Until ASUN football is established, EKU will become a de facto associate member of the Western Athletic Conference (WAC), competing in a football partnership between the two leagues officially branded as the "ASUN–WAC Challenge".

Conference affiliation
 Kentucky Intercollegiate Athletic Conference (1927–1948)
 Ohio Valley Conference (1948–2020)
 ASUN–WAC Challenge (2021)
 ASUN Conference (2022)

Championships

National championships
Eastern Kentucky went to four consecutive national championship games, winning twice in 1979 and 1982 while finishing as runner-up in 1980 and 1981 to Boise State and Idaho State, respectively.

Conference championships
Eastern Kentucky has won 21 conference championships, 16 outright and 5 shared.

† Co-champion

Bowl games
Eastern Kentucky has participated in six bowl games. Four of these bowl games served as a sort of championship game, whether as a regional championship game or as the NCAA Division I Football Championship. The EKU Colonels played in the inaugural Opportunity Bowl presented by Raising Cane's, and in memory of Dr. Sheila Pressley, on Nov. 21, 2020. Eastern Kentucky University hosted the second annual Opportunity Bowl presented by Dinsmore & Shohl on Nov. 20, 2021. The game was matchup EKU and Jacksonville State University.

Playoff appearances

NCAA Division I-AA/FCS
Eastern Kentucky University football is considered the first dynasty in FCS football. Including a four year run to the championship game from 1979 to 1982. During this time period they went 46-7 under legendary coach Roy Kidd. Eastern Kentucky is third all time in the FCS for playoff appearances with 21 total appearances (Montana 26/UNI 22). Below is a list of all playoff appearances.

NCAA Division II
The Colonels made one appearance in the Division II playoffs, with a combined record of 5-1.

Head coaches

Rivalries

Western Kentucky

Morehead State

Program records

Team records
Consecutive winning seasons: 31, 1977–2008
Consecutive wins: 18, 1982–1983
Consecutive National Title appearances: 4, 1979–1982

Individual records
Most rushing yards (game): 300 Markus Thomas against Marshall 1989
Most rushing yards (season): 1,998 Elroy Harris in the 1988 season
Most rushing yards (career): 5,532 Markus Thomas 1989–1992Most passing yards (game): 464 Bennie Coney against Tennessee Tech 2015Most passing yards (season): 2,861 Josh Greco in the 2005 seasonMost passing yards (career): 5,992 Josh Greco 2004–2007Most receiving yards (game): 316 Aaron Marsh against Northwood 1967Most receiving yards (season): 1,150 Andre Ralston in the 2005 seasonMost receiving yards (career): 3,095 Andre Ralston 2002–2005Most completions (season):'225 Bennie Coney 2015

Future non-conference opponents 
Announced schedules as of November 26, 2022.

References

External links
 

 
American football teams established in 1909
1909 establishments in Kentucky